Ceferino Peroné (24 August 1925 – 14 September 2015) was an Argentine cyclist. He competed in the individual and team road race events at the 1948 Summer Olympics.

References

External links
 

1925 births
2015 deaths
Argentine male cyclists
Olympic cyclists of Argentina
Cyclists at the 1948 Summer Olympics
Sportspeople from Buenos Aires Province